Kevin J. H. Dettmar (born 1958) is an American cultural critic who specializes in British and Irish modern literature and contemporary popular music. He is the W.M. Keck Professor of English at Pomona College and the director of the college's humanities studio.

References

Pomona College faculty
Living people
Place of birth missing (living people)
1958 births